Mu Yongjie (born on November 6, 1989 in Shenyang) is a Chinese footballer of Korean descent who plays for Shenyang Dongjin in the China League Two.

External links
Mu Yong Jie - liga-indonesia.co.id

1989 births
Living people
Footballers from Shenyang
Association football forwards
Chinese footballers
Changsha Ginde players
Shenyang Dongjin players
Chinese Super League players
China League One players
Chinese expatriate footballers
Expatriate footballers in Indonesia
Sriwijaya F.C. players
Liga 1 (Indonesia) players
Chinese people of Korean descent